Neocolpodes is a genus of beetles in the family Carabidae, containing the following species, most from Madagascar:

 Neocolpodes acrentomus Jeannel, 1948
 Neocolpodes acritonius (Basilewsky, 1970)
 Neocolpodes afrellus Jeannel, 1951
 Neocolpodes alberti (Alluaud, 1909)
 Neocolpodes alluaudi (Vinson, 1939)
 Neocolpodes almasius Basilewsky, 1985
 Neocolpodes amblyodon (Alluaud, 1899)
 Neocolpodes andasyanus Basilewsky, 1985
 Neocolpodes andohahelo Basilewsky, 1985
 Neocolpodes andrangoloakae Jeannel, 1948
 Neocolpodes andreae (Alluaud, 1935)
 Neocolpodes andrianus Jeannel, 1948
 Neocolpodes andringitrae Basilewsky, 1985
 Neocolpodes androronae Basilewsky, 1985
 Neocolpodes angulosus (Jeannel, 1951)
 Neocolpodes anjavidilavae Basilewsky, 1985
 Neocolpodes anosibensis Basilewsky, 1985
 Neocolpodes anosyanus Basilewsky, 1985
 Neocolpodes antamponae Basilewsky, 1985
 Neocolpodes balachowskyi (Basilewsky, 1970)
 Neocolpodes basilewskyi Jeannel, 1948
 Neocolpodes beananae Basilewsky, 1985
 Neocolpodes beryllinus Basilewsky, 1985
 Neocolpodes bessoni (Alluaud, 1909)
 Neocolpodes blandus (Alluaud, 1897)
 Neocolpodes cachani (Jeannel, 1951)
 Neocolpodes callizonatus (Fairmaire, 1901)
 Neocolpodes casalei Basilewsky, 1985
 Neocolpodes coeruleotinctus Basilewsky, 1985
 Neocolpodes coeruleus Basilewsky, 1985
 Neocolpodes conciliatus Basilewsky, 1985
 Neocolpodes confusus Basilewsky, 1985
 Neocolpodes contractus Basilewsky, 1985
 Neocolpodes coptoderus (Dejean, 1829) RN
 Neocolpodes corpulentus Basilewsky, 1985
 Neocolpodes corythenus Basilewsky, 1970
 Neocolpodes crassicollis Jeannel, 1948
 Neocolpodes cyaneoviolaceus Basilewsky, 1985
 Neocolpodes cyaneus Basilewsky, 1985
 Neocolpodes cyanura (Alluaud, 1909)
 Neocolpodes darlingtoni Basilewsky, 1985
 Neocolpodes descarpentriesianus Basilewsky, 1985
 Neocolpodes deuvei Basilewsky, 1985
 Neocolpodes dialithoides Basilewsky, 1985
 Neocolpodes dialithus (Alluaud, 1909)
 Neocolpodes didy Basilewsky, 1985
 Neocolpodes dieganus (Alluaud, 1897)
 Neocolpodes dilaticollis Jeannel, 1948
 Neocolpodes dirrhaphis (Alluaud, 1897)
 Neocolpodes effulgens Basilewsky, 1970
 Neocolpodes emilii (Alluaud, 1909)
 Neocolpodes episcopalis (Jeannel, 1951)
 Neocolpodes eucharis (Alluaud, 1935)
 Neocolpodes evictus Basilewsky, 1985
 Neocolpodes exiguus (Jeannel, 1951)
 Neocolpodes fairmairei (Alluaud, 1897)
 Neocolpodes fischeri (Chaudoir, 1850)
 Neocolpodes gemmula (Alluaud, 1897)
 Neocolpodes griveaudi Basilewsky, 1985
 Neocolpodes habui Basilewsky, 1985
 Neocolpodes hylobates (Alluaud, 1935)
 Neocolpodes hylobius (Alluaud, 1935)
 Neocolpodes hylochorus (Jeannel, 1951)
 Neocolpodes imerinae (Alluaud, 1897)
 Neocolpodes inermis Jeannel, 1948
 Neocolpodes invocatus Basilewsky, 1985
 Neocolpodes isakae Jeannel, 1948
 Neocolpodes jeannelianus Basilewsky, 1985
 Neocolpodes kryzhanovskyi Basilewsky, 1985
 Neocolpodes laevipennis Jeannel, 1948
 Neocolpodes lapillus (Alluaud, 1932)
 Neocolpodes lecordieri Basilewsky, 1985
 Neocolpodes leptotatus (Alluaud, 1935)
 Neocolpodes leptoteroides Basilewsky, 1985
 Neocolpodes leptoterus (Alluaud, 1935)
 Neocolpodes limbicollis (Fairmaire, 1899)
 Neocolpodes lyauteyi (Alluaud, 1909)
 Neocolpodes malleatus (Alluaud, 1935)
 Neocolpodes mangindranus Basilewsky, 1985
 Neocolpodes marginatus Jeannel, 1948
 Neocolpodes mathiauxi (Alluaud, 1909)
 Neocolpodes meunieri Jeannel, 1948
 Neocolpodes micaauri (Alluaud, 1897)
 Neocolpodes milloti Jeannel, 1949
 Neocolpodes minutus (Jeannel, 1951)
 Neocolpodes monticola Jeannel, 1951
 Neocolpodes montis (Alluaud, 1909)
 Neocolpodes motoensis (Burgeon, 1937)
 Neocolpodes mutans (Fairmaire, 1902)
 Neocolpodes nephriticus Basilewsky, 1985
 Neocolpodes nigrocyaneus Basilewsky, 1985
 Neocolpodes nitens (Jeannel, 1951)
 Neocolpodes oberthueri (Alluaud, 1897)
 Neocolpodes optimus Basilewsky, 1985
 Neocolpodes orophilus Basilewsky, 1985
 Neocolpodes oxypterus Jeannel, 1948
 Neocolpodes papagoensis Basilewsky, 1985
 Neocolpodes parenthesis (Alluaud, 1897)
 Neocolpodes paromius (Alluaud, 1932)
 Neocolpodes pauliani Jeannel, 1949
 Neocolpodes perinetanus Jeannel, 1948
 Neocolpodes perpillus Basilewsky, 1970
 Neocolpodes perrinae Basilewsky, 1985
 Neocolpodes persimilis Basilewsky, 1985
 Neocolpodes peyrierasi Basilewsky, 1985
 Neocolpodes phaedroides (Alluaud, 1932)
 Neocolpodes phaedrus (Alluaud, 1932)
 Neocolpodes phenacoides (Jeannel, 1955)
 Neocolpodes plesioides Jeannel, 1948
 Neocolpodes plesius (Alluaud, 1932)
 Neocolpodes plumbeus Jeannel, 1951
 Neocolpodes porphyreticus (Alluaud, 1935)
 Neocolpodes porphyritis (Alluaud, 1935)
 Neocolpodes poussereaui Deuve, 2007
 Neocolpodes procletus Basilewsky, 1970
 Neocolpodes purpurascens Jeannel, 1951
 Neocolpodes purpureipennis Jeannel, 1948
 Neocolpodes radama (Alluaud, 1897)
 Neocolpodes ranavalonae (Alluaud, 1909)
 Neocolpodes raphideus Jeannel, 1948
 Neocolpodes rex Basilewsky, 1985
 Neocolpodes robinsoni Basilewsky, 1985
 Neocolpodes ruficollis Jeannel, 1948
 Neocolpodes rufofemoratus Basilewsky, 1985
 Neocolpodes rufomarginatus Basilewsky, 1985
 Neocolpodes sambavanus Basilewsky, 1985
 Neocolpodes sambiranus Basilewsky, 1985
 Neocolpodes saphyrinus Basilewsky, 1985
 Neocolpodes serpillus Basilewsky, 1985
 Neocolpodes seyrigi (Alluaud, 1935)
 Neocolpodes silvestris (Alluaud, 1935)
 Neocolpodes smaragdinus Basilewsky, 1985
 Neocolpodes straneoi Basilewsky, 1985
 Neocolpodes subimpressus (Alluaud, 1897)
 Neocolpodes sublaevis (Alluaud, 1909)
 Neocolpodes surdus Basilewsky, 1985
 Neocolpodes suturellus (Alluaud, 1897)
 Neocolpodes sylvaticus (Alluaud, 1897)
 Neocolpodes tanalensis Jeannel, 1948
 Neocolpodes tetragonus (Alluaud, 1932)
 Neocolpodes tetroxys (Alluaud, 1935)
 Neocolpodes tongobory Basilewsky, 1985
 Neocolpodes tsarabe Jeannel, 1948
 Neocolpodes tsaratananae (Jeannel, 1951)
 Neocolpodes turgidus Jeannel, 1948
 Neocolpodes vagus (Alluaud, 1899)
 Neocolpodes velitus Basilewsky, 1985
 Neocolpodes venustus Basilewsky, 1970
 Neocolpodes viettei (Jeannel, 1957)
 Neocolpodes villiersi Basilewsky, 1985
 Neocolpodes viridicollis Jeannel, 1951
 Neocolpodes wintreberti Basilewsky, 1985
 Neocolpodes xestus Basilewsky, 1985

References

Platyninae